Gerhard Polt (born 7 May 1942 in Munich) is a German writer, filmmaker, actor and satirical cabaret artist from Bavaria.

Gerhard Polt's main topics are Bavarian people, culture and politics. On stage he often plays the role of an ignorant Bavarian petty bourgeoisie. One of his trademarks is the constant switching and the combining of 
Bavarian, Standard German and even (pseudo-) Englisch language elements (albeit always performed with strongly Bavarian pronunciation and melody), where a lot of jokes and wordplays derive from.

His performances in Munich theaters, which he started in 1976, are very popular. In 1979 he became known to a wider audience in Germany as a result of his television comedy series Fast wia im richtigen Leben (Almost like in real life). In the following years, he was writer and actor in the movies  (1983), Man spricht deutsh [sic] (1987), Germanikus (2004), and writer and director of Herr Ober! (1992).

He's one of the most regarded and highest decorated German cabaret artists.

Awards
 1980 Deutscher Kleinkunstpreis
 1982 Adolf-Grimme-Preis
 1984 Deutscher Darstellerpreis
 2002 Prix Pantheon
 2006 Kassel Literary Prize.

See also
Biermösl Blosn
Wellbrüder aus'm Biermoos

References

External links 

 

1942 births
German male film actors
German male television actors
Film directors from Munich
Living people
Male actors from Munich
German male dramatists and playwrights
20th-century German dramatists and playwrights
21st-century German dramatists and playwrights
German cabaret performers